The Criminal Procedure Act 1851 (14 & 15 Vict c 100) is an Act of the Parliament of the United Kingdom. It was drafted by Charles Sprengel Greaves. Stephen said that compared to earlier legislation on defects in indictments, the Criminal Procedure Act 1851 "went further in the way of removing technicalities, but it did so by an enumeration of them, so technical and minute, that no one could possibly understand it who had not first acquainted himself with all the technicalities which it was meant to abolish."

The whole Act was repealed by Part I of Schedule 1 to the Statute Law (Repeals) Act 1986.

Section 1
In this section, the words "both with respect to the liability of witnesses to be prosecuted for perjury and otherwise" were repealed by the Schedule to the Perjury Act 1911.

Section 4
This section was repealed by 24 & 25 Vict c 95.

Section 5
So much of this section as related to forging or uttering any instrument was repealed by 24 & 25 Vict c 95.

In this section, so far as it related to Ireland, the words "stealing, "embezzling," and the words "or for obtaining by false pretences" were repealed by the Schedule to the Larceny Act 1916.

Section 6
This section was repealed by 24 & 25 Vict c 95.

Section 8
This section was repealed by 24 & 25 Vict c 95.

Section 9
This section was repealed by Part III of Schedule 3 to the Criminal Law Act 1967.

Section 11
This section was repealed by 24 & 25 Vict c 95.

Section 12
This section was repealed by Part III of Schedule 3 to the Criminal Law Act 1967.

Sections 13 to 17
These sections were repealed by 24 & 25 Vict c 95.

Section 18
This section,  from the words "and in cases" to the end of the section, repealed by the Schedule to the Larceny Act 1916.

Sections 19 to 22
These sections were repealed by the Schedule to the Perjury Act 1911.

Section 27
This section, so far as it applied to Northern Ireland, was repealed by Part I of Schedule 7 to the Judicature (Northern Ireland) Act 1978.

Section 29
So much of this section as related to any indecent assault, or any assault occasioning actual bodily harm, or any attempt to have carnal knowledge of a girl under twelve years of age, was repealed by 24 & 25 Vict c 95.

Section 30
In this section, the word "information", the words "and presentment," and the words from "and the terms" to "a presentment" were repealed by Part III of Schedule 3 to the Criminal Law Act 1967.

See also
Criminal Procedure Act

References
Halsbury's Statutes,
Charles Sprengel Greaves. Lord Campbell's Acts, for the Further Improving the Administration of Criminal Justice, and the Better Prevention of Offences. Late W Benning & Co. Fleet Street, London. 1851. Pages 1 to 35.
Robert Richard Pearce. The New Law of Indictments; comprising Lord Campbell's Administration of Criminal Justice Improvement Act; An Act for the Better Prevention of Offences; and An Act to Amend the Law Relating to the Expenses of Prosecutions, &c. S Sweet, and Stevens & Norton. London. 1851. Pages 19 to 44.
William Hanbury Aggs. Chitty's Statutes of Practical Utility. Sixth Edition. Sweet and Maxwell. Stevens and Sons. Chancery Lane, London. 1912. Volume 3. Title "Criminal Law". Page 258 et seq.
John Mounteney Lely. "The Criminal Procedure Act, 1851". The Statutes of Practical Utility. (Chitty's Statutes). Fifth Edition. Sweet and Maxwell. Stevens and Sons. London. 1894. Volume 3. Title "Criminal Law". Pages 78 to 85.
John Mounteney Lely. Chitty's Collection of Statutes of Practical Utility. Fourth Edition. Henry Sweet. Stevens and Sons. Chancery Lane, London. 1880. Volume 2. Title "Criminal Law". Pages 262 to 267.
The Statutes: Third Revised Edition. HMSO. London. 1950. Volume 6. Page 112 et seq.
The Statutes: Second Revised Edition. Printed under the authority of HMSO. London. 1894. Volume 8. Pages 1002 to 1008.
The Statutes: Revised Edition. London. 1877. Volume 11. Pages 260 to 265.
William Paterson (ed). "Administration of Criminal Justice Improvement Act". The Practical Statutes of the Session 1851. John Crockford. Essex Street, Strand, London. 1851. Pages 256 to 271.
A Collection of the Public General Statutes passed in the Fourteenth and Fifteenth Year of the Reign of Her Majesty Queen Victoria, 1851. Queen's Printer. London. 1851. Page 831 et seq.

External links
The Criminal Procedure Act 1851, as amended from the Irish Statute Book.
British Public Statutes Affected for 1851. Irish Statute Book.
Northern Irish Legislation: Criminal Procedure Act 1851. BAILII.

United Kingdom Acts of Parliament 1851